Kendriya Vidyalaya Barrackpore (KVB), is a school in Kolkata, West Bengal. The school is affiliated to the Central Board of Secondary Education, New Delhi. The school is under Kendriya Vidyalaya Sangathan.

CBSE Affiliation Number : 2400012 CBSE School Number :19206/8404

See also
Central Board of Secondary Education
Kendriya Vidyalaya
Kendriya Vidyalaya Sangathan
List of Kendriya Vidyalayas
NCERT
Education in India
List of schools in India
Education in West Bengal

References

External links

CBSE
Kendriya Vidyalaya Sangathan
NCERT
Official Website
Sakshat 

Kendriya Vidyalayas
High schools and secondary schools in West Bengal
Schools in Kolkata
Educational institutions in India with year of establishment missing
Educational institutions established in 1974